Jean-Gabriel-Honoré Greppo (3 September 1788, in Lyon – 22 September 1863, in Belley) was a French canon remembered for his research in the fields of archaeology and Oriental studies. He was related to canon Jean-Baptiste Greppo (1712–1767), known for his archaeological investigations of ancient Lyon.

Biography 
He received his education in Lyon, then attended the seminary of St. Sulpice in Paris. From 1807 he was associated with the seminary of St. Irenaeus of Lyon, and afterwards became a parish priest in Saint-Just. In 1823 he was appointed vicaire général of Belley.

He was a correspondent member of the Académie des Inscriptions et Belles-Lettres (1840–1863) and the Académie des sciences, belles-lettres et arts de Savoie (1834).

Literary works (selection) 
 Dissertation sur les laraires de l'empereur Sévère Alexandre, 1834 – Dissertation on the lararia of Emperor Alexander Severus.
 Esquisse de l'histoire de la monnaie chez les Hébreux, 1837 – Sketch on the history of money among the Hebrews.
 Essai sur le système hiéroglyphique de M. Champollion le jeune et sur les avantages qu'il offre à la critique sacrée, 1829 – Essay on the hieroglyphic system of Jean-François Champollion, etc.
 Notes historiques, biographiques, archéologiques et littéraires concernant les premiers siècles chrétiens, 1841 – Historical notes, biographical, literary and archaeological, in regards to the early Christian centuries.
 Etudes archéologiques sur les eaux thermales ou minérales de la Gaule à l'époque romaine, 1846 – Archaeological studies on the thermal/mineral waters of Gaul during the Roman era.

References 

1788 births
1863 deaths
Clergy from Lyon
Archaeologists from Lyon
French orientalists
19th-century French Roman Catholic priests